The Scott Morrison ministerial positions controversy developed when it emerged in 2022 that Scott Morrison, while the Prime Minister of Australia, had been secretly appointed to five ministerial positions. An inquiry by Virginia Bell recommended legislative changes to prevent it happening again.

Ministerial appointments
Between March 2020 and May 2021, Morrison, Prime Minister at that time, persuaded the Governor-General to appoint him "to administer" five portfolios in his government, despite there being an incumbent minister in each portfolio.

The five were to the Departments of: Health (14 March 2020); Finance (30 March 2020); Industry, Science, Energy and Resources (15 April 2021); and (together) Home Affairs and Treasury (6 May 2021). All were by an instrument headed "Appointment of Minister of State" and appointing "Scott John Morrison, a member of the Federal Executive Council" to "administer" a specified ministry or ministries. They are personally signed, and stated to be sealed with the Great Seal of Australia, by Governor-General David Hurley.

Public disclosure

These appointments were not made public immediately, contrary to usual practice. None of them became publicly known until 13 August 2022, when two of them were mentioned in a newspaper story about the same journalists' recent book on the Morrison government's management of the COVID-19 pandemic. The newspaper story opened: "Scott Morrison secretly swore himself in as joint health minister ..."; which was taken up by other media but could not have been correct since only the Governor-General can swear a minister in. In fact, since Morrison was already a minister, no swearing-in was necessary or took place. 

On 15 August 2022, recently-elected Prime Minister Anthony Albanese announced an investigation by his office into claims that, on Morrison's advice, the Governor-General, David Hurley had appointed him to three ministerial positions (the Health, Finance, and Resources portfolios) during the COVID-19 pandemic in Australia, although neither the advice nor the appointments had been made public. The Health Minister at the time, Greg Hunt, was understood to have agreed to Morrison's joint appointment as Health Minister; however, the Finance Minister, Mathias Cormann, was unaware that Morrison had appointed himself in a joint ministerial position. The Resources Minister, Keith Pitt, was aware of Morrison's self-appointment to the resources portfolio "sometime in 2021". David Littleproud, who was the Agriculture Minister in Morrison's government, criticised the self-appointments as "pretty ordinary".

Later that day, the Governor-General's office confirmed that Morrison had been appointed to a number of ministerial offices, without stating which or how many. As a change in the responsibilities of an existing minister, this had not required further swearing-in but had been done by an "administrative instrument"; announcement of the appointments had been a matter for the government. Constitutional law professor Anne Twomey, however, could not trace such instruments and called the process "just bizarre". Prime Minister Anthony Albanese ordered a search for them and sought legal advice from the Solicitor-General. Leading members of the Morrison cabinet, Mathias Cormann and Peter Dutton (then Minister for Defence and current Leader of the Opposition), said that they had not been aware of these appointments. Morrison initially declined to comment but later phoned radio station 2GB to say that these three appointments had been "extraordinary measures" as "safeguards" during the COVID pandemic. When asked if he had held any more ministerial positions, Morrison stated that there were none to his "recollection", despite there being two additional appointments still not disclosed to the public at that time. Morrison had himself appointed as joint Resources Minister in order to be able to overrule a decision on gas exploration by the incumbent Resources Minister.

The following day, 16 August, Albanese held a second press conference, confirming that Morrison was appointed to five portfolios in addition to his appointment as the head of Prime Minister and Cabinet: the Department of Health on 14 March 2020; the Department of Finance on 30 March 2020; the Department of Home Affairs on 6 May 2021; the Department of the Treasury on 6 May 2021; and the Department of Industry, Science, Energy, and Resources on 15 April 2021.

In response to the COVID-19 pandemic, Morrison used a provision in the Biosecurity Act 2015 for the Health Minister to be able to shut Australia's borders.

Prime Minister Albanese asked the Solicitor-General for an opinion on the validity of the appointment to the resources ministry. The report, released on 23 August, advised that this appointment has been lawful, but that its secrecy "fundamentally undermined" the principles of responsible government.

Bell inquiry
Anthony Albanese announced an inquiry into Scott Morrison's ministerial positions, led by former High Court Justice Virginia Bell.

On 25 November 2022, Bell reported that Morrison's appointment to multiple ministerial positions was "corrosive" to trust in government. She recommended legislation to ensure all ministerial appointments were made public.

Parliamentary censure
On 30 November 2022, the House of Representatives voted, by 86 votes to 50, for a government motion to censure Scott Morrison for failing to disclose to the parliament and the public his secret appointments to a number of ministries. All non-Coalition votes were in favour, as well as that of Liberal MP Bridget Archer. All other Coalition votes were against, as well as that of Bob Katter.

Those voting for the censure (ALP unless indicated) were: Anthony Albanese, Anne Aly, Michelle Ananda-Rajah, Bridget Archer (LP), Adam Bandt (AG), Stephen Bates (AG), Chris Bowen, Tony Burke, Linda Burney, John Burns, Mark Butler, Jim Chalmers, Max Chandler-Mather (AG), Kate Chaney (IND), Andrew Charlton, Lisa Chesters, Jason Clare, Libby Coker, Julie Collins, Pat Conroy, Zoe Daniel (IND), Mark Dreyfus, Justine Elliot, Cassandra Fernando, Mike Freelander, Carina Garland, Steve Georganas, Andrew Giles, Patrick Gorman, Luke Gosling, Helen Haines (IND), Julian Hill, Ed Husic, Stephen Jones, Ged Kearney, Matt Keogh, Peter Khalil, Catherine King, Madeleine King, Tania Lawrence, Jerome Laxale, Andrew Leigh, Sam Lim, Kristy McBain, Emma McBride, Richard Marles, Zaneta Mascarenhas, Louise Miller-Frost, Brian Mitchell, Rob Mitchell, Daniel Mulino, Shayne Neumann, Brendan O'Connor, Clare O'Neil, Alicia Payne, Graham Perrett, Fiona Phillips, Tanya Plibersek, Gordon Reid, Daniel Repacholi, Amanda Rishworth, Tracey Roberts, Michelle Rowland, Joanne Ryan, Monique Ryan (IND), Sophie Scamps (IND), Marion Scrymgour, Rebekha Sharkie (CA), Bill Shorten, Sally Sitou, David Smith, Allegra Spender (IND), Anne Stanley, Zali Steggall (IND), Meryl Swanson, Susan Templeman, Matt Thistlethwaite, Kate Thwaites, Kylea Tink (IND), Maria Vamvakinou, Elizabeth Watson-Brown (AG), Tim Watts, Anika Wells, Andrew Wilkie (IND), Josh Wilson and Tony Zappia.

Those voting against the censure (Coalition unless indicated) were: Angie Bell, Sam Birrell, Colin Boyce, Russell Broadbent, Scott Buchholz, David Coleman, Pat Conaghan, Mark Coulton, Peter Dutton, Warren Entsch, Paul Fletcher, David Gillespie, Ian Goodenough, Garth Hamilton, Andrew Hastie, Alex Hawke, Kevin Hogan, Luke Howarth, Barnaby Joyce, Bob Katter (KAP), Michelle Landry, Julian Leeser, David Littleproud, Michael McCormack, Melissa McIntosh, Zoe McKenzie, Nola Marino, Scott Morrison, Ted O'Brien, Tony Pasin, Gavin Pearce, Henry Pike, Keith Pitt, Melissa Price, Rowan Ramsey, Stuart Robert, James Stevens, Michael Sukkar, Angus Taylor, Dan Tehan, Phillip Thompson, Ross Vasta, Andrew Wallace, Jenny Ware, Anne Webster, Andrew Willcox, Rick Wilson, Keith Wolahan, Jason Wood and Terry Young.

Those for whom a vote was not recorded were: Karen Andrews (LP), Matt Burnell (ALP), Alison Byrnes (ALP), Darren Chester (NATS), Sharon Claydon (ALP), Milton Dick (Speaker), Andrew Gee (NATS), Dai Le (IND), Sussan Ley (LP), Peta Murphy (ALP), Llew O'Brien (LNP), Sam Rae (ALP), Alan Tudge (LP), Bert van Manen (LP) and Aaron Violi (LP).

Governor-General
Publication of ministerial appointments was a parliamentary convention; it does not seem to have been anybody's legal duty.  A spokesperson for Governor-General David Hurley stated on 17 August:  "The Governor-General had no reason to believe that appointments would not be communicated." Hurley is not criticised by the Solicitor-General, Bell or prime minister Albanese. However, it was submitted to Bell and has since been asked whether Hurley at least ought to have known and, in that case, to have raised a concern.

Legal challenge
A Federal Court challenge to a decision by Home Affairs minister Karen Andrews claims that the decision was invalid, with arguments that could affect all decisions made by ministers whom Morrison had duplicated.  It is claimed that Andrews had no power to make the decision, since Morrison's appointment to the position had displaced herit being, allegedly, implicit in the Constitution that a ministerial position can have only one occupant. Alternatively, it is claimed that, if there was duplication, the decision was "legally unreasonable" since Andrews and her advisors were unaware of the possibility of referring it to Morrison.

Junior ministerial appointments

In March 2023, it emerged that Morrison had proposed and the Governor-General had approved two junior ministerial appointments, adding to the responsibilities of two existing junior ministers, without public knowledge beyond gazetting.  One of those appointments was of an ally of Morrison, Ben Morton, to the ministry of Home Affairs, on the same day as Karen Andrews became minister of Home Affairs.  Morton's appointment to Home Affairs was gazetted but never listed, and Andrews maintains that she never knew of it (Morton eventually did not perform any duties in her department).

Notes

References

External links
 
 
 
 

2022 in Australian politics
Scott Morrison
August 2022 events in Australia
Political controversies in Australia
2022 controversies
Morrison Government